Cambridge is a city in and the county seat of Guernsey County, Ohio, United States. The population was 10,089 at the 2020 census. It is the principal city of the Cambridge micropolitan area and is located adjacent to the intersection of Interstates 70 and 77.

Cambridge is well known among glass collectors as being the location for the Cambridge Glass, Boyd Glass and Mosser Glass plants. The Cambridge area is also noted for its "S" shaped bridges, dating back to the building of the National Road in 1828.

History

In 1796, Col. Ebenezer Zane received funds to blaze a road suitable for travel by horse through the Ohio wilderness from a point on the Ohio River opposite Wheeling, Virginia (now Wheeling, West Virginia) to another point opposite Maysville, Kentucky. Where this road, known as Zane's Trace, crossed Wills Creek, a ferry was established in 1798. This was followed by the first bridge authorized by the legislature of the Northwest Territory, built in 1803. The land on which part of Cambridge stands was granted to Zaccheus Biggs and Zaccheus Beatty by the government in 1801. A settlement grew up at the creek crossing. The town of Cambridge was platted there in 1806. Both Cambridge, Maryland and Cambridge, Massachusetts have been speculated by historians as having inspired the naming of the town. Also in 1806, another group of early settlers from the Isle of Guernsey in the English Channel pitched camp in Cambridge, reportedly because the women in the party refused to move on. The county for which Cambridge serves as the county seat was later named in honor of its many settlers from Guernsey. In 1828, the federally built National Road came through Cambridge. The first railroad arrived in 1854. The Cambridge area experienced massive flooding in late June 1998.

Geography
Cambridge is located along Wills Creek; its tributary Leatherwood Creek flows into Wills Creek in the southern part of the city.

Climate

Demographics

2010 census
As of the census of 2010, there were 10,635 people, 4,651 households, and 2,604 families living in the city. The racial makeup of the city was 92.7% White, 3.4% African American, 0.3% Native American, 0.3% Asian, 0.3% from other races, and 3.0% from two or more races. Hispanic or Latino of any race were 1.2% of the population.

There were 4,651 households, of which 30.3% had children under the age of 18 living with them, 33.9% were married couples living together, 16.9% had a female householder with no husband present, 5.2% had a male householder with no wife present, and 44.0% were non-families. 38.2% of all households were made up of individuals, and 17% had someone living alone who was 65 years of age or older. The average household size was 2.23 and the average family size was 2.94.

The median age in the city was 38.8 years. 24.6% of residents were under the age of 18; 8.7% were between the ages of 18 and 24; 24.6% were from 25 to 44; 24.8% were from 45 to 64; and 17.3% were 65 years of age or older. The gender makeup of the city was 46.6% male and 53.4% female.

2000 census
As of the census of 2000, there were 11,520 people, 4,924 households, and 2,954 families living in the city. The population density was 2,055.1 people per square mile (792.9/km). There were 5,585 housing units of an average density of 996.3 per square mile (384.4/km). The racial makeup of the city was 92.84% White, 3.91% African American, 0.33% Native American, 0.37% Asian, 0.47% from other races, and 2.07% from two or more races. Hispanic or Latino of any race were 0.96% of the population.

There were 4,924 households, out of which 30.5% had children under the age of 18, 39.2% were married couples living together, 16.3% had a female householder with no husband present, and 40.0% were non-families. 35.3% of all households were made up of individuals, and 15.9% had someone living alone who was 65 years of age or older. The average household size was 2.28 and the average family size was 2.92.

The population of the city was spread out, with 25.9% under the age of 18, 9.2% from 18 to 24, 26.5% from 25 to 44, 20.9% from 45 to 64, and 17.5% who were 65 years of age or older. The median age was 36 years. For every 100 females, there were 85.8 males and every 100 females aged 18 and over, there were 79.9 males.

The median income for a household in the city was $24,102, and the median income for a family was $30,780. Males had a median income of $26,368 versus $20,596 for females. The per capita income for the city was $14,452. About 18.1% of families and 30.2% of the population were below the poverty line, including 29.5% of those under age 18 and 12.2% of those age 65 or over.

Education
The Cambridge City School District administers one primary school (K–2), one intermediate school (3–5), one middle school and Cambridge High School. St. Benedict Elementary School is a Roman Catholic institution.

The Guernsey County Public Library operates two libraries in the city.

Transportation

Cambridge is the site of a major junction between Interstate 70 and Interstate 77; both routes have exits connecting to Cambridge's city center. The city is additionally bisected by U.S. Route 22, acting as the de facto "main street", and is not too far away from Cambridge Municipal Airport, primarily used for general aviation. The closest commercial airport is Mid-Ohio Valley Regional Airport, but the airport only serves Contour Airlines and flies regionally; the closest commercial airport with cross-country service is John Glenn Columbus International Airport.

Notable people
William Lawrence Boyd, actor who portrayed western character Hopalong Cassidy in 66 films, lived on Gomber Avenue
Dom Capers, defensive coordinator for NFL's Green Bay Packers; former defensive coordinator for Miami Dolphins and Pittsburgh Steelers, also first head coach of Houston Texans and of Carolina Panthers
Doug Donley, former wide receiver for Dallas Cowboys and Chicago Bears
Tom Eyen, experimental playwright, lyricist, and theatre director, author of Dreamgirls for which he won 1981 Tony Award for Best Book of a Musical
Geno Ford, former Ohio Mr. Basketball and Ohio University player and coach; head coach at Kent State and Bradley
John Glenn, United States Senator, chairman of the Senate Committee on Governmental Affairs, NASA astronaut, NASA payload specialist, United States Navy and Marine Corps colonel, World War II and Korean War veteran, first American to orbit earth in his Mercury-Atlas 6 mission
Lisa Howard, film and television actress and journalist
Bill Kenworthy, Major League Baseball player from 1912-1917
Orville Singer, Negro league baseball player from 1923-1932
William Oxley Thompson, fifth president of Ohio State University

References

External links

 City website
 Cambridge City Schools
 The Daily Jeffersonian

 
Cities in Ohio
County seats in Ohio
Cities in Guernsey County, Ohio
Populated places established in 1806
1806 establishments in Ohio